The Metro Manila Film Festival Award for Best Visual Effects is an award presented annually by the Metropolitan Manila Development Authority (MMDA). It was first awarded at the 16th Metro Manila Film Festival ceremony, held in 1990; Sammy Arranzamendez and Benny Batoccoy won the award for their creation of visual effects in Shake, Rattle & Roll II and it is given to an animator(s) who demonstrate great visual effects in a motion picture. Currently, nominees and winners are determined by Executive Committees, headed by the Metropolitan Manila Development Authority Chairman and key members of the film industry.

Winners and nominees

1990s

2000s

2010s

2020s

References

External links
IMDB: Metro Manila Film Festival
Official website of the Metro Manila Film Festival

Visual Effects
Film awards for Best Visual Effects